The Beautiful Trauma World Tour was the seventh concert tour by American singer Pink, in support of her seventh studio album, Beautiful Trauma (2017). The tour began in Phoenix, Arizona on March 1, 2018, at the Talking Stick Resort Arena, and concluded on November 2, 2019, in Austin, Texas at the Circuit of the Americas. It became the second highest-grossing tour of all time by a female solo artist, the highest-grossing tour of the 2010s by a female artist, and the tenth highest-grossing tour of all time, earning $397.3 million and selling over 3 million tickets.

Development

After the end of the successful The Truth About Love Tour (which was the third best-selling tour of 2013 with $147.9 million in ticket revenue) and the release of the album rose ave. with Canadian singer-songwriter Dallas Green under the name You+Me, Pink took a break. However, during this time, she released some songs, including "Today's the Day" on September 10, 2015, used as a theme song for season 13 of The Ellen DeGeneres Show and "Just like Fire" on April 15, 2016, for the soundtrack to the 2016 film Alice Through the Looking Glass.

On August 10, 2017, the lead single "What About Us" was released. On October 4, 2017, Pink announced she would release an Apple Music documentary about the recording of her anticipated seventh studio album Beautiful Trauma, later released on October 13. The following day, she announced the tour, revealing tour dates in North America. Originally, the singer has planned to play 40 shows, but due to high demand, second dates in Chicago, Toronto, New York City, Boston, Washington, D.C., Houston, Dallas and Oakland were later added. On October 9, 2017, she announced 17 dates in Australia and New Zealand. However, due to overwhelming demand, new shows were added, bringing the total number to 42 shows in Oceania.

On May 3, 2018, after incredible success and demand, Pink announced a second North American leg starting in 2019, including rescheduled shows for Detroit and Montreal, following previous postponements, due to illness.

On October 16, 2018, Pink revealed the European dates, which were scheduled between June and August 2019. These shows took place in stadiums instead of arenas like the previous dates on this tour. Second dates were added in Cologne, Munich and Glasgow, due to high demand; additional dates in Oslo, Horsens, Gelsenkirchen and The Hague were later announced. She announced a show in Rio de Janeiro, as part of 2019 Rock in Rio festival; this concert marked her first performance in South America.

On April 18, 2019, Pink announced a performance at the 2019 Formula One United States Grand Prix Concert Series in Austin. She later announced that she had to reschedule her May 2019 Toronto shows due to illness. The new dates took place in August after the European leg of the tour. Along with the rescheduled dates, Pink announced a concert in Uniondale, New York at the Nassau Veterans Memorial Coliseum.

Critical response

North America

Ed Masley from The Arizona Republic, who was at the first show of the tour which took place in Phoenix, wrote that "the whole thing was brilliantly staged, with bright colors, interpretive dancing and plenty of high-flying spectacle. If for some reason, you believe you've seen another artist put more time and effort into doing acrobatics high above the crowd, you may just be thinking of Cirque du Soleil." Jimmie Tramel of Tulsa World reviewed positively the concert on March 5, 2018, in Tulsa. He said "Wow. That's really the only word necessary to describe Pink's concert Monday night at the BOK Center." Omaha World-Herald staff writer Kevin Coffey attended and reviewed the concert in Lincoln, stating that Pink has "set the bar very, very high" and that "her contemporaries should buy a ticket, sit in the back and take notes. That's how it should be done." Also L. Kent Wolgamott attended the same show and wrote another positive review for Journal Star, saying that "More than years ago, she delivered the best show in the first year of Pinnacle Bank Arena. On Tuesday night, she did it again with another singing/dancing/flying spectacle that [...] not only sets the bar for concerts, it is the bar." He also praised Pink's stage presence: "When she wasn't flying around, Pink was in constant motion on the stage, joining her 10 dancers in tightly choreographed routines, slapping hands with audience members and basking in the spotlights." Kirstine Walton of National Rock Review reviewed the first show in Chicago, stating that "Each time you see P!nk you wonder what new elements she can bring to the performance, but each time she raises the bar yet again. Not only does she make the entire performance appear to be effortless, she truly looks like she is having the time of her life on the stage." She also noticed the connection between Pink and her tour crew, adding that "the respect and camaraderie for her band and dancers is clearly evident throughout, taking the time to name everyone individually, providing each of them their moment in the spotlight in turn."

The second show at Madison Square Garden in New York City was reviewed positively by Bobby Olivier of NJ.com, who defined the Beautiful Trauma World tour "the tour to beat in 2018". He also wrote that Pink is "a terrific live vocalist with a list of radio hits so long that she cannot fit them all into a single set while still giving space to songs from a new album." After the show in Boston on April 9, Marc Hirsh from Boston Globe, about Pink's performances, stated that "None of this is new, of course. But the fact remains that no other pop star is even attempting this sort of thing, so to watch Pink do it and keep singing remains as astonishing as when she first added literal acrobatics without a harness or net to her arsenal years ago." The concert in Atlanta was reviewed positively by Melissa Ruggieri from The Atlanta Journal-Constitution, who defined it "nearly two hours of unabashed fun." She also praised Pink as a person as well as an entertainer: "The fact that Pink does it all with a sly smile and potent, husky vocals is a tribute to her stamina, dedication and obvious joy at being onstage. She's also a down-to-earth presence to her fans, spending plenty of time laying on the catwalk floor to take selfies, acknowledging signs and accepting a gift for her 16-month-old son, Jameson [...] Pink has all the right moves. She's genuine, she's entertaining, she's a fantastic singer. And she's already the front-runner for the best concert of 2018."

Matthew Keever wrote a positive review for Houston Press about the show which took place on April 27, stating that "For nearly two hours, P!NK entertained a throng of enthusiastic fans with her soaring vocals, catchy choruses and high-flying acrobatics." Another positive review was written by Jim Harrington from Mercury News, who attended the show in Oakland. He said that "the pop superstar basically hits the crowd with everything she's got, and then some, for roughly two hours. There's pyrotechnics, aerial stunts, dance routines, hit songs, catchy banter and, yes, one giant, inflatable Eminem." He also added that Pink is "[...] all about exceeding expectations, pleasing the fans and delivering an equally encompassing and entertaining concert experience. And she definitely achieves her mission with her latest road show." Mikael Wood, regarding the show that took place in Anaheim, wrote a positive review for Los Angeles Times. In particular, he praised Pink's choice about the setlist: "yet for all Pink's razzle-dazzle — and let me be clear in saying that this new aerial stunt was truly astounding — the primary effect of Friday's production wasn't practical or technological but emotional. You left the gig feeling as if you had been spoken to from the heart, which in a room as big as this one might be the more impressive feat. [...] her hit singles from the last two decades put across an idea of timelessness; she's still taking a broadly universal approach."

Oceania
The first show in Oceania was reviewed positively by Ross McRae, who defined Pink's tour "her best yet", due to "the perfect mix of choreography, visuals, aerial acrobatics, pyrotechnics, novelty, sass and yes, that soaring voice that rises above any notion that she is just a robot on autopilot." Aziz Al-Sa'afin from Newshub attended one of the shows in Sydney and ended his review stating that "when it was over, I wanted more. I could have happily sat through another two hours of what I had just experienced." He also wrote that "P!nk is not just a singer-song writer - she's also a dancer, trapeze artist and comedian." The first show in Brisbane was reviewed by Daniel Johnson of Courier-Mail, who stated that "with an eight-piece backing band and ten dancers, and several set changes, the Beautiful Trauma tour is a musical, visual and theatrical extravaganza that redefines what can be done with an arena pop show." Another positive review was made by Bridget Jones for Stuff.co.nz: "up, down, front, back, left and right, Pink was everywhere, doing everything. Every move, every comment, and every song her fans wanted to hear - she performed about 20 of them throughout the spectacular performance - she took the audience on a wee journey from her early days as the bad girl of pop [...] through to her more recent hits." In addition, Pink's charisma was defined "unmatched".

Europe
Lisa O'Donnell wrote a positive review for Extra for the show in Dublin, who called "The spectacle is over-the-top in every possible way — circus aerial stunts and glitter explosions feature throughout the two-hour show." Sophie Williams from The Guardian rated the Cardiff show five out of five stars, stating "Pink condenses a tour's worth of energy, showmanship and stage production into one show, flexing her athleticism while singing live, on-key and with sublime verve." Elle May Rice from Liverpool Echo reviewed for Liverpool saying "Pink definitely has it all, balancing - literally - her incredible vocals, frequent costume changes, and daring acrobatics routines seamlessly...She made the whole crowd feel like family, bringing us together in a perfect, Pink way."

Commercial performance 
The first official boxscore from the tour was published on March 14, 2018, denoting superior numbers to The Truth About Love Tour. The show in Wichita at Intrust Bank Arena grossed $1,647,788 with 11,894 attendees, numbers superior to any single concert revenue of her previous tours in the country. The first leg of the North American part of the tour grossed $95,657,338 with an attendance of 691,247 over the first 46 dates of the tour.

Pink was the top earning artist for March 2019, grossing $30,082,031 with 207,979 attendees from 15 shows in her second leg of North America.

Set list 
This set list is from the show in Chicago on March 9, 2018. It may not represent all concerts for the duration of the tour.

"Get the Party Started"
"Beautiful Trauma"
"Just Like a Pill"
"Who Knew"
"Revenge"
"Funhouse" / "Just a Girl" 
"Smells Like Teen Spirit"
"Secrets"
"Try"
"Just Give Me a Reason"
"I'm Not Dead"
"Just like Fire"
"What About Us"
"For Now"
"Barbies"
"I Am Here"
"Fuckin' Perfect"
"Raise Your Glass"
"Blow Me (One Last Kiss)"
Encore
"So What"
"Glitter in the Air"

Notes 
 During the March 20, 2018, show in Toronto, Pink was joined by Dallas Green onstage to perform "You and Me" from their joint album, rose ave. (2014).
 During the May 31, 2018, show in Los Angeles, Pink was joined by Gwen Stefani onstage in a joint surprise performance of "Just a Girl".
 "For Now" was not performed at selected dates.
 In 2019, "Walk Me Home" was added to the set list in place of "I'm Not Dead".
 Starting on April 6, 2019, show in Vancouver, "Hustle" was performed at selected dates in place of "Smells Like Teen Spirit".
 During the May 21, 2019, show in New York City, Pink was joined by Chris Stapleton onstage to perform "Love Me Anyway".
 During the show in Dublin, Pink performed a cover of "River" by Bishop Briggs, "90 Days" (performed with Wrabel) and "Can We Pretend" were added to the set list, while "Walk Me Home" was performed acoustically. "Revenge", "Barbies" and "Glitter in the Air" were not performed.
 During the show in Rio de Janeiro, a cover of "We Are the Champions" by Queen was performed in place of "For Now".

Tour dates

Cancelled shows

Notes

References

External links
Official website

Pink (singer) concert tours
2018 concert tours
2019 concert tours
Concert tours of Australia
Concert tours of Canada
Concert tours of Europe
Concert tours of France
Concert tours of Germany
Concert tours of Ireland
Concert tours of North America
Concert tours of New Zealand
Concert tours of Oceania
Concert tours of South America
Concert tours of the United Kingdom
Concert tours of the United States